Wahiduddin Adams is currently a justice of the Constitutional Court of Indonesia. He and Aswanto were appointed to the court by the People's Representative Council in March 2014. Adams formerly served as Director General of Legislation at the Ministry of Law and Human Rights.

During his tenure as Director General, he often represented the Government of Indonesia in cases of judicial review. Adams has been notable for his position in support of gender-based affirmative action for membership in the People's Representative Council. However, he was also among the minority judges who supported the criminalization of pre-marital sex and homosexuality in the Constitutional Court's decision in 2017.

References

Justices of the Constitutional Court of Indonesia
21st-century Indonesian judges
Living people
Year of birth missing (living people)